The Warren Bingoes were a minor league baseball team based in Warren, Pennsylvania and Warren County, Pennsylvania. From 1914 to 1916, Warren teams played as members of the Class D level Interstate League, with the 1916 team nicknamed as the "Warriors." The 1908 Warren "Blues" preceded the Bingoes in Interstate League play. Warren hosted home minor league games at Russell Park.

History
The 1895 "Warren" team first played minor league baseball as members of the Iron and Oil League. In 1908, the Warren Blues played a partial season as members of the Class D level Interstate League.

In 1908, the Warren Blues placed second as the Interstate League folded during the season. On June 5, 1908, the league folded. With a record of 11–8, Warren finished 5.5 games behind the first place Olean Candidates. Bernard McNeal managed Warren in the shortened season.

The Warren "Bingoes" rejoined the six team, Class D Interstate League in 1914. The Bradford Drillers, Hornell Green Sox, Jamestown Giants, Olean Refiners and Wellsville Rainmakers teams joined Warren in beginning league play on May 22, 1914.

The Warren Bingoes ended the Class D level Interstate League season in third place in the six–team league. With a record of 57–45, the Bingoes were managed by Bill Webb. In the final standings, the Miners finished 3.5 games behind the first place Jamestown Giants. The Bingoes did not qualify for the playoff, won by Jamestown over Bradford.

In 1915, the Bingoes continued play and placed fifth in the fifth Interstate League final standings, as no playoffs were held. Warren ended their 1915 season with a record of 33–50, playing the season under managers R.W. Archer and George Bell. The Bingoes finished 16.5 games behind the first place Wellsville Rainmakers in the standings.

The Interstate League continued play in 1916, but the newly named Warren "Warriors" did not survive the season. On August 4, 1916, the Warriors had a record of 24–19 when the team folded. Frank Shaughnessy served at the Warren manager in their partial season.

The Interstate League did not return to play in 1917. Warren next hosted minor league baseball with the 1940 Warren Redskins, who began play as members of the Class D level Pennsylvania State Association.

The ballpark
The Warren teams hosted home minor league games at Russell Park.

Timeline

Year–by–year records

Notable alumni

George Bell (1915, MGR)
Bill Brady (1914)
Dick Cotter (1916)
Joe Gingras (1916)
Carmen Hill (1914)
George Payne (1916)
Frank Shaughnessy (1916, MGR)
Frank Smykal (1916)

See also
Warren Bingoes playersWarren Warriors players

References

External links
Warren - Baseball Reference

Defunct minor league baseball teams
Baseball teams established in 1914
Baseball teams disestablished in 1915
Defunct baseball teams in Pennsylvania
Defunct Interstate League teams
Warren, Pennsylvania